This is a timeline of Brazilian history, comprising important legal and territorial changes and political events in Brazil and its predecessor states. To read about the background to these events, see History of Brazil.

 Centuries: 10th 15th 16th17th
18th19th20th21st

10th century

15th century

16th century

17th century

18th century

19th century

20th century

21st century

See also
 Timeline of Amazon history
 Timelines of cities in Brazil

References

Bibliography
in English
 
 
 
 
 
 
 
 

in Portuguese
 . 1885?

Brazilian